Diamond Eyes is the sixth studio album by American alternative metal band Deftones, released on May 4, 2010, by Reprise Records. It was the first album to feature bassist Sergio Vega, who replaced original bassist Chi Cheng. An album tentatively titled Eros was originally intended to be the band's sixth full-length release following Saturday Night Wrist (2006), but was not finished due to Cheng entering a coma after a serious car accident that occurred in November 2008, eventually resulting in his death in 2013. The band continued on with Vega as his replacement, and the release of Eros was put on hold in favor of Diamond Eyes in June 2009.

Diamond Eyes was a critical and commercial success, peaking within the top ten of the US Billboard 200 and several other international charts; it was the band's highest charting album on the Billboard 200 since their 2003 eponymous fourth album. Four singles were released from Diamond Eyes: the title track, "Rocket Skates", "Sextape", and "You've Seen the Butcher".

Background

Deftones started writing material for the successor to 2006's Saturday Night Wrist in early 2007. The band was dissatisfied with the lengthy writing and recording process of Saturday Night Wrist, and wanted to release a quick follow-up record in the same manner as earlier albums such as 1995's Adrenaline and 1997's Around the Fur, which were recorded without the digital audio program Pro Tools. Instead, those albums were recorded as just a band "in the room with just our instruments, no other distractions", according to frontman Chino Moreno.

The band recorded and completed their Terry Date-produced album, tentatively titled Eros, in 2008, and it was expected to be released in early 2009. However, bassist Chi Cheng was seriously injured in an automobile accident in November 2008, leaving him in a coma and putting the release of Eros on hold. Unsure if or when Cheng would recover and be able to perform with the band again, Deftones started playing various shows and festivals with Sergio Vega on bass, starting in early 2009. Vega, a close friend of the band, had previously filled in for Cheng during tours in 1999. At this point, Deftones were not sure if they wanted to break up or continue writing and performing music.

In June 2009, Deftones decided to indefinitely put the release of Eros on hold and start writing a brand new album with Vega. The band still hopes to release Eros at some point, but wanted to wait until Cheng was no longer in a semi-conscious state, and they did not feel that it represented who they were as artists or as people at the time. Deftones wanted to make an optimistic record, as opposed to the dark and angry album they had just finished.

Diamond Eyes was recorded in two months with producer Nick Raskulinecz, who had previously worked with Foo Fighters, Velvet Revolver, Stone Sour and Alice in Chains. Deftones avoided using Pro Tools on the album. Instead, they favored writing songs together as a band and practicing them "a million times 'til they were perfect" in order to achieve a more raw and "personable" sound.

Release
Diamond Eyes was originally scheduled to be released on April 27 by Reprise, but was pushed back three weeks to May 18, and later pushed forward to May 4, 2010. The latter release date change was possibly due to the album leaking onto the Internet in March 2010, two months before the original scheduled release date.

The first song from the album, "Rocket Skates", was available for free download through the band's official website on February 23, 2010. The song had been included in Deftones live performances starting in October 2009, and was later released as a limited edition 7" vinyl single for international Record Store Day on April 17, 2010, serving as the second overall single. A music video directed by 13th Witness (Tim McGurr) was released on March 9.

The first single, however, was the title track, "Diamond Eyes". It was released as a single to digital retailers on March 23, 2010. The music video for the song, directed by Roboshobo (Robert Schober), was released on April 13. Deftones performed a live webcast of songs from Diamond Eyes and answered fan questions on May 4 in Dallas, Texas. A music video for the track "Sextape" was released on September 3, 2010. The video was directed by ZFCL (Zak Forrest and Chad Liebenguth, known for their work with Foxy Shazam and Fang Island). On October 28, 2010, Deftones released the official video for "You've Seen the Butcher", directed by Jodeb Films. In August 2011, Deftones released the official music video for "Beauty School", directed by 13th Witness.

At just over 41 minutes, not including the pre-order and deluxe edition bonus tracks, Diamond Eyes is Deftones' shortest album.

Lyrics and themes
After dealing with the tragedy surrounding Cheng's accident, Deftones wanted to create an album with an overall positive and optimistic vibe. Describing the band's state while writing for the album, Moreno stated, "Our inspiration and unity as a band is stronger than it has ever been before and we needed to channel that energy into our music". Noticeably lacking on the album were songs about complaining, hurting or how "life sucks" – common lyrical themes for Moreno since the early '90s. Moreno described the overall theme of the album as a "positive zest for life", and also said it had "a fantasy vibe" similar to White Pony. The lyrics for "Rocket Skates" contained "beautiful yet violent imagery" and were compared to the song "Knife Prty" from White Pony. Deftones also thought it would be difficult to tour in support of a new album with memories of Cheng attached to it. Commenting on songwriting, Moreno stated:

Reception

Critical reception

Initial reaction to the album from music critics was highly favorable. Stephen Thomas Erlewine of AllMusic wrote, "Naturally, there is quite a bit of roiling darkness here -- they're Cure-loving metalheads, it's in their blood -- but there's shade and light, control of texture, with the band deepening rather than expanding." Jason Pettigrew of Alternative Press stated, "Unlike their alleged 'peers' (do they really have any?), Deftones learned years ago that a whisper can be more terrifying than a scream and power isn't always about BPMs and downstrokes per minute." He also added that Diamond Eyes "belongs in a pantheon of amazing albums born from tragedy". BBC writer Mike Diver was also impressed, and opined that the album "knocks every pretender to the band's throne into the middle of next week". He praised the band for playing to their strengths, and summarized: "Eros is reportedly their excursion into weirdness, while this is a statement of consolidation, a neatly segued set that finds Deftones playing to their well-established strengths."

Writing for Metalholic, Doron Beit-Halahmi said the album was "slated to be a classic in the world of alternative metal, this album is just as good, if not better than 2000’s White Pony". NPR described the sound of the album as "goth-rock tinged shoegaze".

BLARE Magazine's Joshua Khan observed "Deftones give birth to a refined sound that makes creations like 'Prince' and '976-Evil' enslaving." The Skinny's Mark Shukla likewise explained, "The first four tracks set a blistering pace as churning riffs transition relentlessly into fret-burning breakdowns; all the while Chino Moreno deploying his wounded croon and lacerating howl with an intensity that remains impressively undiminished." Sputnikmusic staff writer Nick Greer gave an unequivocally positive review and called the album "better than White Pony". He described the album's sound as "intense and visceral, but introspective and sensitive in ways Deftones have never been before", before finally adding, "I can honestly say it's Deftones' best album to date." Scott Gordon of The A.V. Club stated that while there are moments on the album where Deftones "sound a bit like a band on auto-pilot", many of the other tracks "stomp such limp moments with pleasingly crude riffs that claw and scrape through the verses, then release Chino Moreno's voice into glimmering, menacing choruses."

Slant Magazine described the tracks "Sextape" and "Beauty School" as shoegaze.

Album of the year/decade lists
Diamond Eyes was named "Rock Album of the Year" by the iTunes Store. Kerrang magazine also placed it as their Album of the Year.

In their roundup of the 25 Best Metal Albums of 2010–2019, the music blog MetalSucks ranked Diamond Eyes as the 4th best metal album of the '10s.

Revolver Magazine ranked Diamond Eyes as the best album of the Decade.

Charts and sales
Diamond Eyes was expected to sell between 55,000 and 60,000 records in the U.S. during its first week, based on first-day sales, according to Hits Daily Double. The album sold above these expectations, moving 62,000 copies in the U.S. It debuted at No. 6 on the Billboard 200, making it the fourth consecutive Deftones album to debut within that chart's top 10.

As of October 2012, the album had sold approximately 236,000 copies in the U.S.

Track listing

Personnel
Diamond Eyes personnel according to CD liner notes.

Deftones
 Stephen Carpenter – guitars
 Abe Cunningham – drums
 Frank Delgado – keyboards, samples, turntables
 Chino Moreno – vocals, guitars
 Sergio Vega – bass

Art and design
 Frank Maddocks – creative direction and design
 John Ross – owl photos
 13th Witness (Tim McGurr) – band photo

Production and recording
 Keith Armstrong – assisted mixing
 David Benveniste – A&R
 Paul Figueroa – recording, engineering
 Ted Jensen – mastering
 Nik Karpen – assisted mixing
 Chris Lord-Alge – mixing
 Nick Raskulinecz – producer, mixing
 Andrew Schubert – additional engineering
 Brad Townsend – additional engineering
 Tom Whalley – executive producer
 Kevin Willianson – A&R for Warner Bros. Records

Charts

References

2010 albums
Deftones albums
Reprise Records albums
Albums produced by Nick Raskulinecz